Stéphane Bijoux (born 8 Octobre 1970) is a French politician who was elected as a Member of the European Parliament in 2019.

Early life and education
Bijoux is a journalist from Réunion. He has been director of television editorials Overseas (La Première, France Ô) and responsible for diversity in the Information at France Télévisions.

Member of the European Parliament
Since becoming a Member of the European Parliament, Bijoux has been serving on the Committee on Regional Development. In addition to his committee assignments, he is part of the European Parliament Intergroup on Climate Change, Biodiversity and Sustainable Development, the European Parliament Intergroup on Seas, Rivers, Islands and Coastal Areas and the MEPs Against Cancer group.

References

1970 births
Living people
MEPs for France 2019–2024
La République En Marche! politicians
La République En Marche! MEPs
People from Saint-Denis, Réunion
Bordeaux Montaigne University alumni
French television journalists
Politicians of Réunion